The 1960 24 Hours of Le Mans was the 28th 24 Hours of Le Mans Grand Prix of Endurance, and took place on 25 and 26 June 1960, on Circuit de la Sarthe.  It was the fifth and final round of the F.I.A. World Sports Car Championship as well as being the fifth round of the inaugural FIA GT Cup. It was held just a week after the tragic Belgian F1 GP in which four drivers, including Stirling Moss were either killed or seriously injured. The prospect of a duel between the  Ferrari versus the  Porsche championship-leaders was enough to draw large crowds to the 24 Hours race and some 200,000 spectators had gathered for Europe's classic sports car race, around the  course.

Faced with a must-win result to take the World Championship, Ferrari came well-prepared and with 13 entries, from the works and privateer teams. Their main competition would come from Maserati and the British teams, although American Corvettes also made an appearance in the GT-category. The race was barely three hours old when torrential rain hit the circuit causing a number of accidents and issues as water got into the engines. More and more rivals fell away through the night leaving Ferrari to dominate the race. In the end its Sports and GT cars taking 7 of the top 8 places, with only the Aston Martin of the Scottish Border Reivers team in 3rd breaking the sequence. Belgian Olivier Gendebien got his second victory, this time with his countryman, sports journalist/racing-driver, Paul Frère in the works car. Through fast, but reliable, driving they were never seriously threatened, finishing four laps and over 50 km ahead of the second-placed Ferrari.

Regulations
After its overhaul of the GT classes in its Appendix J regulations, the CSI (Commission Sportive Internationale - the FIA’s regulations body) looked at retro-fitting them to the Appendix C rules for Sports Cars.

There were fourteen classes based on engine capacity (with a maximum of  although the World Championship was only open to a  maximum) with corresponding set fuel tank sizes. But it was the minimum height and width of widescreens (based on those of GT cars) that caused controversy and after the first round in Argentina a number of senior drivers had protested about the danger in poor weather.

GT cars had to be at least  and needed a minimum of 100 cars manufactured within 12 months. Although some bodywork changes could be done the net weight could not change by more than 5%.

With the new fuel-tank sizes, the Automobile Club de l'Ouest (ACO) dropped the minimum distance between fuel refills but kept the 25-lap limit for the other fluids. The maximum single-stint for a driver was increased to 52 laps (about 4 hours), although the total driver time was still 14 hours. To be classified, cars had to complete the last lap in less than 30 minutes, and stay within 20% of their nominated Index distance at every 6 hour interval.

To promote their new Index of Thermal Efficiency fuel-economy competition, this year the ACO increased the prize money at the expense of the older Index of Performance. After the 1960 currency devaluation, the winner's purse was now 30000 New Francs (about £6750 equivalent at the time) and 2000 New Francs respectively (and 50000 New Frances for the overall distance winner). The Index calculations were also tweaked slightly to account for the bigger windscreens reducing top speeds.

Entries
The ACO received 72 entries for the event, of which only 58 were allowed to practice trying to qualify for the 55 places on the grid (increasing by one from the 54 of previous years). Official ‘works’ entries numbered 27, but a number of companies gave strong support to their customer teams. Going into the last race of the championship both Scuderia Ferrari and Porsche arrived with 4-car teams.

With last year's winner Aston Martin having withdrawn from sports car racing to concentrate on Formula One, Ferrari were once again favourites, even though they had only won the opening round of the championship in Argentina and were trailing Porsche in the championship standings. Four works cars arrived: two were updated Testarossas and two were the new TRI chassis with independent suspension. Driving the updated TR59/60s this year the experienced pairing of Gendebien & Phil Hill were split up. Belgian Gendebien was paired with compatriot Paul Frère (who had been second in 1959 for Aston Martin), while Hill was driving with fellow Ferrari F1 team-member Wolfgang von Trips. One of the newer TRIs were driven by the other Scuderia F1 drivers Willy Mairesse/Richie Ginther and the second by youngsters Ludovico Scarfiotti/ Ricardo Rodríguez. A 1959-model Testarossa was also run by Luigi Chinetti’s North American Racing Team (NART), driven by the older Rodriguez brother, Pedro and André Pilette.

Even though the company was still having financial difficulties, this year marked the successful return of Maserati to sports car racing with the highly competitive Tipo 61 ‘Birdcage’, raced by American Lloyd Casner's Camoradi Racing Team. The new team, sponsored by Goodyear tyres, had just caused an upset winning the previous race in the championship at the Nürburgring. Three cars were entered, driven by Casner himself with Jim Jeffords, Gino Munaron/Giorgio Scarlatti, while Masten Gregory and Chuck Daigh drove the updated original prototype. Designer Giulio Alfieri had carefully interpreted the CSI windscreen rules which specified a height but not an angle. So with a windscreen almost half the length of the car, it was very aerodynamic and very fast – reaching  on the Mulsanne straight, compared to the Testarossa's .

This year there were four British cars in the premier class. Ecurie Ecosse entered the 6-year old D-Type that had finished 2nd in 1957, modified with an enlarged windscreen and luggage hump, detracting from its formerly elegant lines. It was driven by Ron Flockhart and Bruce Halford. Their local rivals, Jock McBain's Border Reivers team ran an equally modified Aston Martin DBR, with the previous year's winner Roy Salvadori this year partnered with rising star Jim Clark. The Aston Martin that won that race had been bought by Ian Baillie, a Major in the Grenadier Guards who had Jack Fairman as co-driver.

The other British car caused a sensation and marked a welcome return to Le Mans for American Briggs Cunningham. Jaguar Cars had worked with Cunningham, their New York dealer, to prepare one of their new E-type prototypes for competition. Americans Dan Gurney and Walt Hansgen were the drivers.

After two outright wins (at Sebring and the Targa Florio) Porsche came to Le Mans as leaders of the Championship with its new RS60 variant. But with a top speed of only 145 mph (235 kp/h) they would be no match for the bigger cars on the long straight. Working with the new rules, they fitted two cars with special 1606cc engines (generating 180 bhp) to put them into the 2-litre category with the consequent bigger fuel tank. They were also the only team to fit wipers on both the inside and outside of the windscreens. This year the works cars were driven by Jo Bonnier/Graham Hill and Hans Herrmann/ Maurice Trintignant. Edgar Barth / Wolfgang Seidel drove the regular RS60, supported again by the two privateer entries from Carel Godin de Beaufort and Jean Kerguen.

Triumph returned to take on the Porsches with their TRS prototype of the upcoming TR4, led once again by former winner Ninian Sanderson.  The privateer MG that raced the previous year also returned. In the smaller classes there were single entries from Alfa Romeo and the new Lola company competing in the S-1150 class. The Lola Mk 1 was fitted with the Coventry Climax FWA engine, developing 90 bhp. It was also the lightest car in the field, only 

In the next class down, S-1000, two works DB-Panhards would vie with Austin-Healey returning to the circuit with their new Sprite. In the busy smallest class there were eleven entries including four DB-Panhards, as well as Stanguellini, OSCA and a trio of cars from Fiat performance-specialists Abarth. Reflecting changing times, the six DB-Panhard sports were the only French cars in the field this year.

There were 22 entries in the GT classes. The largest cars in the race were four  V8 Chevrolet Corvettes after a good showing at Sebring. Stopping the heavy cars would be an issue and many thought they would suffer from brake problems on the tight corners like at the end of the long Mulsanne Straight. Three were entered by Briggs Cunningham, returning to Le Mans after five years away. He drove one with Bill Kimberly, with the others by Dick Thompson/Fred Windridge and Cunningham team-regular John Fitch/Bob Grossman. The fourth Corvette was entered by the Camoradi team.

Up against them was a squadron of eight Ferrari 250 GT Berlinettas. Forghieri's new short-wheelbase variant had just been homologated on raceweek. Three were entered by Chinetti's NART, two more by the Belgian Ecurie Francorchamps and Equipe Nationale Belge. There were also entries from the new Italian Scuderia Serenissima, Graham Whitehead (changing from running Jaguar and Aston Martin) and Le Mans local Fernand Tavano who had only received his car at the start of the week.

Lotus dominated the middle categories with the five Elites. One of the three works cars had been given the  FPF Climax engine to enter the GT-2000 class against a pair of privateer AC Aces. It would be driven by Herbert Linge and Heini Walter.

Practice
After the success last year, the ACO was again able to close the public roads on 9 April. Fourteen cars took advantage of the 10 hours of extended testing time.

Official qualifying was held over two sessions for a total of 540 minutes over the two days and there were two major accidents. Serenissima Ferrari GT. D’Orey's car speared off the track and hit a roadside tree with such force that it broke the car in two. The young Brazilian suffered severe head injuries that kept him in hospital for 8 months. On Thursday, Jonathon Sieff's Team Lotus car had catastrophic suspension collapse while on the Mulsanne straight. He hit a small hut and the Marks & Spencer heir was badly injured. Out of caution, Lotus withdrew its  GT as it was fitted with the same suspension units.

On Friday, when the roads were public domain once again, the repaired Jaguar went out for test laps finding its handling was not perfect.

Race

Start
With no Stirling Moss at the race, it was the equally fleet-footed Jim Clark who was first away in his Aston Martin. But he was soon overtaken, firstly by Walt Hansgen in the Jaguar prototype, then the extremely fast Camoradi Maserati. After a delayed start Masten Gregory blasted past twenty cars to be leading at the end of the first lap. He set about building a considerable lead, getting out to 70 seconds at the end of an incident-free first hour. The five Testarossas, led by Gendebien, were 2nd through 6th, then came the Ecosse Jaguar, Scarlatti's Maserati and Tavano leading the GT classes ahead of Clark in 10th.

But it was as the first pit-stops were approaching that things started going wrong. The increased drag on the enlarged windscreens meant fuel consumption was increased. Two of the Ferraris, pushing hard to keep up with the Maserati were caught out and both von Trips and Scarfiotti ran out of fuel ending up marooned out on the track on their 22nd lap. Gendebien was extremely lucky to run out just as he approached the pits, and coasted into his pit-box. Then when Gregory brought in the Maserati from the lead to refuel and change drivers the car refused to restart. They lost nearly an hour, and 11 laps, while the starter motor was replaced. Rejoining in 46th place they made up 17 places before soaked electrics put them out after midnight. Refueled, Frère, then Gendebien, took a lead they would never relinquish.

Going into the third hour it started to rain heavily, even hailing at times, creating havoc on the track. With the windscreens impossible to see through, many drivers pitted for cushions to allow them to see over the screens. Bill Kimberley had just taken over Cunningham's Corvette, sent out by his team manager on slick tyres when he aquaplaned off at Maison Blanche, rolled end-over-end twice then slid down the grass ending right side up. Fortunately Kimberly was unhurt.

At 8pm, after four hours, Gendebien and Frère had a lap's lead over the field. Gunther/Mairesse led the chase ahead of the NART Ferrari and Ecosse Jaguar then, a lap further back, the Aston Martin & Tavano leading the GT classes.

Night
Going into the night, with the better handling Aston Martin, and superb car control, Clark and Salvadori were able to catch up and overtake the Ferraris, getting up to second place soon after 11pm. The rain then eased allowing the power of the Ferraris to come to bear again. At midnight, after 8 hours racing, Gendebien still led from Ginther/Mairesse, then the Aston Martin, Rodriguez’ Ferrari and the Ecosse Jaguar. In 6th was Whitehead's Ferrari leading the GTs, chased by the Fitch/Grossman Corvette and the French & Belgian Ferrari GTs. In 10th was the first Porsche, of Barth/Seidel, with a handy lead over the rest of the smaller cars.

The final Maserati (Casner's own) retired with engine issues likely caused by debris from Casner's slip into the Tertre Rouge sand-trap. The E-type lost three laps at the start with fuel-injection issues, had fought back to the edge of the top-10, lost time again with burnt pistons, then retired with a blown head gasket after midnight.

Later through the night Pedro Rodriguez put in very fast laps moving up from 5th to catch, pass and then lap Mairesse into second, only to lose it again when he was stopped for ten minutes to fix a misfire. The Ecosse Jaguar had been running alternately third and fourth through the night until at dawn at 5.30am it came to a halt at Arnage with a broken camshaft.  It was the end of the illustrious D-type story at Le Mans.

Morning
By Sunday morning, the rain had cleared and the sun was shining. About 8.15am, with Gendebien/ Frère now holding a 5-lap lead, the Ginther/Mairesse Ferrari's gearbox gave up, handing second place back to the NART car, now well ahead of the Aston Martin. Through most of the race the Laureau/Armagnac DB had been leading the Index of Performance from the Guichet/Condriller Abarth, with one of the Porsches back in 3rd.  The Porsches had been falling away through the night. After being delayed at the start, the Hill/Bonnier car had got back up to 14th until it too was stopped with engine problems. It was the smaller car of Barth/Seidel that had been the best performer, getting up to 9th and mixing it with the Ferrari and Corvette GTs before it started getting gearbox problems.

The Ferrari GTs had all been running strongly. The Whitehead/Taylor car, after initially leading the GT pack until midnight, had been chasing the French Ferrari of Tavano running in 4th. Then at 12.45, when Taylor was travelling at full speed down the Mulsanne straight, the engine detonated with such force it blew the bonnet off the car.

Finish and post-race

With the retirements, the remaining Corvette of Fitch/Grossman had moved up to 6th. Then with barely two hours Grossman came in with no water, well before the next fluid refill. Fetching ice from their VIP tent, the crew packed it around the engine instructing the driver to do 10-minute laps, attracting great attention from the crowd. Then the gearbox of the Barth Porsche lost three of it gears with a couple of hours to go. The team parked it up waiting for the last quarter-hour to make a fraught final lap. In the meantime it was overtaken by the Porsche GT that finished 10th.

Otherwise, the last part of the race was processional. Coming home third, a further four laps adrift, was 1959 winner Roy Salvadori with Jim Clark in their Aston Martin, breaking up the Ferrari train. The Ferrari GTs followed up their 3-4-5-6 result in 1959 with a 4-5-6-7, forming up in a formation finish behind the leading Testarossas. The Corvette struggled on, finishing 8th, before the engine seized completely just after the finishing line. The other Aston Martin, despite leaking oil for most of the race, stayed consistent and finished 9th.

Once again the bullet-proof Panhard-engined DBs performed very well, four of the five cars finishing. The  coupé of Bouharde and Jaeger ran an impressive  fuel economy. The open-top spyder of Armagnac and Laureau comfortably won the Index of Performance going over 25% than its nominal distance. They were also the final winners of the Biennial Cup for best performance over consecutive years.

But it was the two surviving Lotus Elites that carried off the Thermal Efficiency prize – the works car just beating the French privateer entry. The three Triumphs staged a formation finish, however after battling valve problems all race none could cover their mandatory distance and were not classified. British cars also won class trophies – the privateer MG was first 2-litre car home and the Austin-Healey Sprite beat the DBs in the 1-litre class.

A proud day for Belgium with three of the drivers in the first two cars coming from that country. The Belgian Prince de Mérode was the honorary starter in his role as President of the FIA, and on hand to congratulate his countrymen at the end of the race. Likewise the Belgian king sent telegrams of congratulations to the drivers. After this success, Paul Frère retired from racing, to resume his regular employment as a motoring journalist, and consultant on motor-racing regulations.

Official results

Finishers
Results taken from Quentin Spurring's book, officially licensed by the ACO
Class Winners are in Bold text.
{| class="wikitable" style="font-size: 100%;"
! Pos
! Class
! No
! Team
! Drivers
! Chassis
! Engine
! Laps
|-
! 1
| S3.0
| 11
|  Scuderia Ferrari
|  Olivier Gendebien Paul Frère
| Ferrari 250 TR59/60
| Ferrari 3.0L V12
| 314
|-
! 2
| S3.0
| 17
|  North American Racing Team
|  André Pilette Ricardo Rodríguez
| Ferrari 250 TR59
| Ferrari 3.0L V12
| 310
|-
! 3
| S3.0
| 7
|  Border Reivers
|  Roy Salvadori Jim Clark
| Aston Martin DBR1/300
| Aston Martin 3.0L S6
| 306
|-
! 4
| GT3.0
| 16
|  F. Tavano(private entrant)
|  Fernand Tavano “Loustel” (Pierre Dumay)
| Ferrari 250 GT SWB
| Ferrari 3.0L V12
| 302
|-
! 5
| GT3.0
| 18
|  North American Racing Team
|  George Arents Alan Connell, Jr
| Ferrari 250 GT SWB
| Ferrari 3.0L V12
| 300
|-
! 6
| GT3.0
| 22
|  Ecurie Francorchamps
|  “Eldé” (Leon Dernier) Pierre Noblet
| Ferrari 250 GT SWB
| Ferrari 3.0L V12
| 300
|-
! 7
| GT3.0
| 19
|  North American Racing Team
|  Ed Hugus Augie Pabst
| Ferrari 250 GT SWB
| Ferrari 3.0L V12
| 299
|-
! 8
| GT5.0
| 3
|  B.S. Cunningham
|  John Fitch Bob Grossman
| Chevrolet Corvette C1 Coupé
| Chevrolet 4.6L V8
| 281
|-
! 9
| S3.0
| 8
|  Maj I.B. Baillie(private entrant)
|  Ian Baillie Jack Fairman
| Aston Martin DBR1/300
| Aston Martin 3.0L S6
| 281
|-
! N/C*
| GT5.0
| 4
|  Camoradi USA
|  Fred Gamble Leon Lilley
| Chevrolet Corvette C1 Coupé
| Chevrolet 4.6L V8
| 275
|-
! 10
| GT1.6
| 35
|  Porsche KG
|  Herbert Linge Hans Walter
| Porsche 356 B Carrera GTL Abarth
| Porsche 1588cc F4
| 269
|-
! 11
| S1.6
| 39
|  Porsche KG 
|  Edgar Barth Wolfgang Seidel | Porsche 718 RS60/4
| Porsche 1498cc F4
| 264
|-
! 12
| S2.0| 32|  E. Lund(private entrant)
|  Ted Lund Colin Escott| MG MGA Twin Cam Coupé
| BMC 1762cc S4
| 262
|-
! 13
| GT1.3| 44|  R. Masson(private entrant)
|  Roger Masson Claude Laurent| Lotus Elite
| Coventry ClimaxFWE 1216cc S4
| 261
|-
! 14
| GT1.3
| 41
|  Team Lotus Engineering
|  John Wagstaff Tony Marsh
| Lotus Elite
| Coventry ClimaxFWE 1216cc S4
| 257
|-
! N/C*
| S2.0
| 28
|  Standard Triumph Ltd
|  Keith Ballisat Marcel Becquart
| Triumph TRS
| Triumph 1985cc S4
| 256
|-
! 15
| S850| 48|  AutomobilesDeutsch et Bonnet|  Gérard Laureau Paul Armagnac| D.B. HBR-4 LM
| Panhard 702ccsupercharged F2
| 253
|-
! N/C*
| S2.0
| 59(reserve)
|  Standard Triumph Ltd
|  Les Leston Mike Rothschild
| Triumph TRS
| Triumph 1985cc S4
| 252
|-
! N/C*
| S2.0
| 29
|  Standard Triumph Ltd
|  Ninian Sanderson Peter Bolton
| Triumph TRS
| Triumph 1985cc S4
| 249
|-
! 16
| S1.0| 46|  Donald Healey Motor Company|  John Dalton John Colgate| Austin-Healey Sprite Spyder.
| BMC 571cc S4
| 246
|-
! 17
| S1.0
| 47
|  AutomobilesDeutsch et Bonnet
|  Pierre Lelong Maurice van der Bruwaene
| D.B. HBR-5
| Panhard 851cc F2
| 244
|-
! N/C*
| GT2.0
| 30
|  Ecurie Lausannoise
|  André Wicky Georges Gachnang
| AC Ace Coupé
| Bristol 1971cc S6
| 239
|-
! 18
| S850
| 54
|  E. Hugus(private entrant)
|  John Bentley John Gordon
| O.S.C.A. Nuevo Sport 750
| OSCA 746cc S4
| 237
|-
! 19
| S1.0
| 56
|  AutomobilesDeutsch et Bonnet
|  Robert Bourharde Jean-François Jaeger
| D.B. HBR-4 Coupé
| Panhard 851cc F2
| 228
|-
! 20
| S1.0
| 52
|  AutomobilesDeutsch et Bonnet
|  René Bartholoni Bernard de Saint-Auban
| D.B. HBR-4 Super Rallye
| Panhard 851cc F2
| 223
|}
Note *: Not Classified because car failed to complete 80% of its Index of Performance distance.

Did Not Finish

Did Not Start

Class Winners

Index of Thermal Efficiency

Index of PerformanceNote: Only the top ten positions are included in this set of standings. A score of 1.00 means meeting the minimum distance for the car, and a higher score is exceeding the nominal target distance.

26th Rudge-Whitworth Biennial Cup (1959/1960)Note''': this was the final awarding of the Biennial Cup.

Statistics
Taken from Quentin Spurring's book, officially licensed by the ACO
 Fastest Lap in practice –  Dan Gurney, #6 Jaguar E2A - 4:04.5secs; 
 Fastest Lap:  Masten Gregory, #24 Maserati T60/61 - 4:04.0secs;   
 Distance - 
 Winner's Average Speed -

Standings after the race

FIA World Sportscar Championship

Championship points were awarded for the first six places in each race in the order of 8-6-4-3-2-1. 
Manufacturers were only awarded points for their highest finishing car with no points awarded for additional cars finishing. Only the best 4 results out of the 5 races would be included for the final score. Total points earned are shown within brackets.

Citations

References
 Clarke, R.M. - editor (1997)    Le Mans 'The Jaguar Years 1949-1957'    Cobham, Surrey: Brooklands Books  
 Clarke, R.M. - editor (2009)    Le Mans 'The Ferrari Years 1958-1965'    Cobham, Surrey: Brooklands Books  
 Clausager, Anders (1982)    Le Mans    London: Arthur Barker Ltd  
 Laban, Brian (2001)    Le Mans 24 Hours    London: Virgin Books   
 Moity, Christian (1974)    The Le Mans 24 Hour Race 1949-1973    Radnor, Pennsylvania: Chilton Book Co  
 Spurring, Quentin (2010)    Le Mans 1960-69    Yeovil, Somerset: Haynes Publishing  
 Wilkins, Gordon - editor (1960)    Automobile Year #8 1960-61    Lausanne: Edita S.A.

External links
 Racing Sports Cars – Le Mans 24 Hours 1960 entries, results, technical detail. Retrieved 12 November 2017
 Le Mans History – Le Mans History, hour-by-hour (incl. pictures, YouTube links). Retrieved 12 November 2017
  Sportscars.tv – race commentary. Retrieved 12 November 2017
  World Sports Racing Prototypes – results, reserve entries & chassis numbers. Retrieved 12 November 2017
  Formula 2 – Le Mans 1960 results & reserve entries. Retrieved 10 August 2017
 ConceptCarz ] – article about Corvette's race. Retrieved 16 November 2017
  Team Dan – results & reserve entries, explaining driver listings. Retrieved 12 November 2017
  Unique Cars & Parts – results & reserve entries. Retrieved 12 November 2017
 YouTube “Corvette at Le Mans”	colour documentary by GM (35 mins). Retrieved 12 November 2017

Le Mans
24 Hours of Le Mans races
Le Mans